George Barlow (born 1948) is an American poet. He graduated from California State University, East Bay, and from the University of Iowa with an M.A. in American Studies and an M.F.A. George Barlow currently teaches at Grinnell College.

He has published in The Black Scholar, Caliban 2, River Styx, The Iowa Review, Antaeus, Callaloo, The Beloit Poetry Journal, Nimrod, The American Poetry Review, Yardbird Reader, Big Moon and Obsidian.

He was on the nominating committee for the Iowa poet laureate.

Awards
 Woodrow Wilson Fellowship
 Ford Foundation Fellowship
 1980 National Poetry Series, for Gumbo

Works

Editor
 About Time III: An Anthology of California Prison Writing, Grady Hillman, Maude Meehan, George Barlow eds.

Anthologies

References

1948 births
Living people
American male poets
California State University, East Bay alumni
University of Iowa alumni
Grinnell College faculty